General elections were held in Uruguay on 29 November 1942, alongside a constitutional referendum. The result was a victory for the Colorado Party, which won a majority of seats in the Chamber of Deputies and received the most votes in the presidential election, in which the Juan José de Amézaga faction emerged as the largest. Amézaga subsequently became President on 1 March 1943.

Results

References

External links
Politics Data Bank at the Social Sciences School – Universidad de la República (Uruguay)

Elections in Uruguay
Uruguay
General
Uruguay
Election and referendum articles with incomplete results